Fishburne may refer to:

People with the surname
 John W. Fishburne, American politician
 Laurence Fishburne, American actor
 Lillian E. Fishburne, American admiral

Other uses
 Fishburne Military School

See also
 Fishburn (disambiguation)
 Fishbourne (disambiguation)